The Gajendra Narayan Singh Sagarmatha Zonal Hospital is a zonal hospital in  saptari district of southern Nepal. It has more than hundred beds and the service of X-ray and CT Scan. The hospital can handle more than 500 patients.

References 

Hospitals in Nepal